Cesare Ligario (1716- after 1755) was an Italian painter. He was born in Milan, the son of Giovanni Pietro Ligario. He studied at Venice under Giovanni Battista Pittoni, and afterwards with his father. His grandson, Angelo Ligari, was also a painter, who restored a painting by Pietro at the Collegiata of Sondrio.

References

1716 births
18th-century Italian painters
Italian male painters
Year of death unknown
18th-century Italian male artists